Robert Bryan Charles Kneale  (born 19 June 1930) is a Manx artist and sculptor, described by BBC News Online as "one of the Isle of Man's best known artists."

Biography
Born in the island's capital, Douglas, Kneale studied painting at the Douglas School of Art, from which he graduated in 1947, and then moved to London, to study at the Royal Academy Schools. In 1948, he won the Rome Prize and spent some time living in Italy. During the 1950s, he learned welding, and in 1960 took to sculpture in preference to painting, and became a teacher.

He has taught at Hornsey College of Art and Design, and from 1963 until his retirement from teaching in 1995 he taught sculpture at the Royal College of Art. He was also Master and later Professor of Sculpture at the Royal Academy between 1982 and 1990. In addition to his teaching, numerous exhibitions of his own painting and sculpture work have been held since 1953, and his works are displayed in countries such as Australia, Brazil, New Zealand and the United States. In the US, the Museum of Modern Art in New York City includes examples of his work amongst its public collections.

He was awarded a Leverhulme Trust Prize in 1952, as well as the Daily Express Young Painters' Prize (1955) and an Arts Council Purchase Award (1969). After a successful solo show at the Whitechapel Gallery in 1966, Kneale became the first abstract sculptor to be elected a Royal Academician in 1974. He accepted the honour only on the condition that he be allowed to curate a show of contemporary sculpture which resulted in a groundbreaking survey of some of the period's most exciting sculptors.

Kneale is the younger brother of the screenwriter Nigel Kneale (1922–2006), best known for his Quatermass television serials. Kneale illustrated the covers for Penguin Books' releases of his elder brother's Quatermass scripts in 1960. He was also responsible for a painting of a lobster from which BBC special effects designers Bernard Wilkie and Jack Kine drew their inspiration for the Martian creatures they constructed for  Quatermass and the Pit (1958–59).

For his sculpture Capt Quilliam, he received the 2007 Marsh Award for Excellence in Public Sculpture. He was appointed a Member of the Order of the British Empire (MBE) in the 2019 New Year Honours, for services to British Art.

He currently lives in London.

References

External links

Bryan Kneale at the Isle of Man Government.
 
Bryan Kneale at ArtCyclopedia.com.
Bryan Kneale at hartgallery.co.uk (The London-based Hart Gallery was closed down sometime time after 2012)

1930 births
Living people
Academics of the Royal College of Art
Manx sculptors
Manx artists
Members of the Royal West of England Academy
People from Douglas, Isle of Man
Royal Academicians
Members of the Order of the British Empire